The Tripartite Convention of 1899 concluded the  Second Samoan Civil War, resulting in the formal partition of the Samoan archipelago into a German colony and a United States territory.

Forerunners to the Tripartite Convention of 1899 were the Washington Conference of 1887, the Treaty of Berlin of 1889, and the Anglo-German Agreement on Samoa of 1899.

Politics prior to the convention

By the 1870s modern economic conditions were well established and accepted by the Samoans, who had just enough of a government that could be manipulated at will by the foreign business interests in Samoa.  After the United States concluded a friendship treaty with Samoa in 1878, Germany negotiated her own Favorite Nation Treaty in 1879 with the same Samoan faction as the U.S., while later in 1879 the Anglo-Samoan treaty was completed with a rival faction.  Contentions among the whites in Samoa, plus native factional strife led to side-choosing that became deadly warring with the introduction of modern weapons.

Washington conference of 1887
To attempt to resolve some of the problems, the United States, Germany, and the United Kingdom agreed to a conference in Washington in June 1887.  After the surfacing of serious disagreements among the parties, the conference adjourned without results.  Fighting by nationals of the three powers with their factional local allies led to a conflict that was only tempered by the Apia hurricane of 1889 that wrecked warships on the verge of hostilities.

Treaty of Berlin of 1889

The seriousness of the situation was finally recognized and German foreign minister Count Herbert von Bismarck (chancellor Otto von Bismarck's son) proposed to reconvene the adjourned Washington conference of 1887.  He invited U.S. and British representatives to Berlin in April 1889. Bismarck's pragmatic approach proposed protection for life, property, and commerce of the treaty participants and relegated native government and their unstable "kings" to the Samoans, with which the British concurred.  The United States insisted on a three-powers authority while preserving native rights.  In the Treaty of Berlin of 1889 thus a joint protectorate or condominium was declared, with a European/American chief justice, a municipal council for Apia, and with the "free right of the natives to elect their Chief or King" as the signatory to the act, thus the treaty professed to recognize a Samoan independent government.

No sooner was the native royal figurehead appointed (and, after disturbances, restored), than the other chiefs rebelled, and civil war ensued. By the end of the 19th century, the failure of the arrangement was freely admitted by the governments of the three powers, since the principal protagonists in Samoa acted directly for their own respective interests, frequently overruling the officials of the condominium.

The Tripartite Convention of 1899

The German government "had never made a secret of their belief that international control of Samoa was visionary and impractical ... and they began a series of diplomatic moves intended to eliminate it altogether." In April the British government agreed to the formation of a joint commission of Germany, the US, Great Britain, and the UK on the matter. The Joint Commission on Samoa was given authority to supersede local authorities and settle matters. Their arrival in May effectively ended hostilities. By July the commission had decided that the islands must be partitioned, as continued joint rule was infeasible. The American commissioner Bartlett Tripp endorsed the view of President McKinley and others that the United States should retain Tutuila and its harbor of Pago Pago. With partitioning of Samoa by then the prevailing understanding, the United States expressed no objections to Britain and Germany coming to a preliminary agreement. The United Kingdom was then embroiled in the Second Boer War and therefore viewed as in a weakened bargaining position; however, the German desire to rapidly conclude the negotiations and bring the western Samoan islands into their colonial empire had a balancing effect that was clearly evidenced in the agreement as signed.

Kaiser Wilhelm II had accepted an invitation to visit England in November 1899 and his government insisted that an agreement on Samoa should be concluded before his departure for Britain.  A settlement was reached at London by 9 November and signed on 14 November.  It was therefore this Anglo-German agreement on Samoa in tandem with the informal understanding with the United States that partitioned Samoa. It only remained for the three powers to negotiate a tripartite convention in order to secure the approval of the United States to the whole agreement.  The Tripartite Convention of 1899 was duly constituted and documents were signed at Washington on 2 December 1899 by the U.S. Secretary of State John Hay, Baron Theodor von Holleben, German ambassador to the United States, and Sir Julian Pauncefote, British ambassador to the United States, with ratifications exchanged on 16 February 1900.

Positions resulting from the Tripartite Convention of 1899 
United States:

President William McKinley signed an executive order on 19 February 1900, reading: "The Island of Tutuila, of the Samoan Group, and all other islands of the group east of longitude 171 degrees west of Greenwich, are hereby placed under the control of the Department of the Navy for a naval station.  The Secretary of the Navy shall take such steps as are necessary to establish the authority of the United States and to give to the islands the necessary protection."  On the same day John D. Long, Secretary of the Navy, stated further that these islands "... are hereby established into a naval station, to be known as the naval station, Tutuila, and to be under the command of a commandant."  Rose Island, an uninhabited coral atoll, and the island of Aunu'u were included. The cession of deeds of the islands of the Manua Group (Ta'u and Ofu-Olosega) did not take place until 1904, although the respective chiefs had previously accepted the sovereignty of the United States. The term "American Samoa" entered into conscious usage in 1905 with a first assembly, or fono, of the Samoan chiefs on all ceded islands within the naval station.

German Empire:
The Samoan islands of Upolu and Savaii and the small islands of Apolima and Manono, west of 171 degrees west longitude, were declared a protectorate of the German Empire, and became known as German Samoa, with a flag-raising on 1 March 1900, and appointment of Wilhelm Solf as governor. This "happy acquisition" was viewed in Germany as a "splendid achievement in colonial policy, which is at the same time a genuinely popular one."

United Kingdom:
By surrendering all rights in Samoa, the United Kingdom "obtained extensive compensation from Germany elsewhere", in effect, 
 "transfer of all of the German rights in the Tonga group including”
 “that of establishing a naval and coaling station,”
 “and the right of extraterritoriality;”
 “the shifting of the line of demarcation between German and British islands in the Solomon group so as to give to Great Britain all the German islands to the east and southeast of the island of Bougainville;”
 “the division of the so-called neutral zone in West Africa by a definite boundary line between British and German possessions;” 
 “the promise of Germany to take into consideration, as much and as far as possible, the wishes which the Government of Great Britain may express with regard to the development of reciprocal tariffs in the territories of”
 “Togo and”
 “the Gold Coast;”
 “the renouncing by Germany of her rights of extraterritoriality in Zanzibar."

These treaty arrangements of the Tripartite Convention of 1899 stayed in place until the outbreak of World War I in 1914.

Footnotes

Bibliography and references
 Coates, Austin.  Western Pacific Islands.  London: H.M. Stationery Office. 1970.
 Gilson, R. P.  Samoa 1830-1900, The Politics of a Multi-Cultural Community.  Melbourne: Oxford University Press. 1970.
 Gray, J. A. C.  Amerika Samoa, A History of American Samoa and its United States Naval Administration.  Annapolis: United States Naval Institute. 1960.
 Ryden, George Herbert.  The Foreign Policy of the United States in Relation to Samoa.  New York: Octagon Books. 1975. (Reprinted by special arrangement with Yale University Press. Originally published at New Haven: Yale University Press. 1928.)
 Townsend, Mary Evelyn. Origins of Modern German Colonialism, 1871-1885. New York: Vol. IX of Columbia University Studies in History, Economics, and Public Law. 1921.

See also
 Treaty of Cession of Tutuila
 Treaty of Cession of Manu'a
 Samoan unification

External links
 Annexation of Samoa
 WHKMLA: Samoa, 1830-1899
 History of Samoa - R.M. Watson

History of the Samoan Islands
Boundary treaties
1899 in Samoa
1899 in American Samoa
1899 in the German colonial empire
German Samoa
History of Samoa
History of American Samoa
Treaties of the German Empire
Treaties of the United Kingdom
Treaties of the United States
Treaties concluded in 1899
Treaties entered into force in 1900
1899 establishments in Oceania
1914 disestablishments in Oceania
British colonisation of Oceania
German colonisation in Oceania
History of United States expansionism
American Samoa–Samoa border
Germany–United States relations
Germany–United Kingdom relations
December 1899 events